Mazagran may refer to:
 Mazagran (drink), a coffee drink made with lemon juice
 Mazagran (drinkware), a kind of Algerian drinkware usually used for coffee

Places 
 Mazagran, Algeria, an Algerian town in Mostaganem Province
 Battle of Mazagran, 1840
 Mazagran (Tourcelles-Chaumont), a French village
 Rue de Mazagran, a French street in the 10th arrondissement of Paris